The Brew Keeper was a brewery in North Ridgeville, Ohio, United States. It opened in 1997 in Bedford Heights, Ohio as a Brew-On-Premises (BOP) brewery, later adding taps and a restaurant after it moved to North Ridgeville, Ohio in 2007.

As a microbrewery, the Brew Keeper used the name Mad Brewer to denote their beer sold outside their facility in other drinking establishments and retail outlets. Their beers were mostly high-gravity, some reaching as high as 12% alcohol by volume which is the legal limit for the definition of beer in Ohio (typical beers have around 3% to 8% alcohol by volume).

The Brew Keeper closed in 2010 due to financial reasons.

See also
 Beer in the United States

References

Companies based in Ohio
Beer brewing companies based in Ohio
Food and drink companies established in 1997
1997 establishments in Ohio